Colin Bradford (born 30 May 1955) is a Jamaican former track and field athlete who specialised in sprinting events. He represented Jamaica at the Olympic Games in 1976 and 1980.

Born in Saint Catherine, he gained his first honours at the 1974 CARIFTA Games, where in the under-20s section he claimed bronze medals over 100 metres and 200 metres. He was selected to contest these events at the 1976 Summer Olympics – he reached the 200 m final, coming in seventh, while his teammate Don Quarrie took the gold medal. Bradford also ran in the 4×400 metres relay and came fifth in the final alongside Quarrie, Leighton Priestley and Seymour Newman. He represented Jamaica at the 1978 Commonwealth Games and secured the 200 m bronze medal.

He competed over 400 metres individually and in the relay at the 1979 Central American and Caribbean Championships in Athletics and took gold medals in both events. Bradford was chosen for the 200 m as well as both the 100 and 400 m relays at the 1980 Moscow Olympics, but was eliminated in the heats stages of all three events. The following year he won the 100 m title at the 1981 Central American and Caribbean Championships in Athletics and formed part of the Americas 4×400 m relay team for the 1981 IAAF World Cup. His final global competition was the 1983 World Championships in Athletics, where he ran in the heats of the 200 m and anchored a Jamaican team of George Walcott, Ray Stewart and Leroy Reid to seventh place in the 4×100 metres relay final.

His personal bests were 10.15 seconds for 100 m, 20.66 over 200 m and a 400 m time of 45.94 seconds.

Major competition record

References

Living people
1955 births
Jamaican male sprinters
People from Saint Catherine Parish
Olympic athletes of Jamaica
Athletes (track and field) at the 1976 Summer Olympics
Athletes (track and field) at the 1980 Summer Olympics
Commonwealth Games bronze medallists for Jamaica
Commonwealth Games medallists in athletics
Athletes (track and field) at the 1978 Commonwealth Games
Athletes (track and field) at the 1979 Pan American Games
Pan American Games medalists in athletics (track and field)
Pan American Games silver medalists for Jamaica
Medalists at the 1979 Pan American Games
Medallists at the 1978 Commonwealth Games